Sidikat Odunkanwi (born November 1960), professionally known as Iyabo Oko, is a Nigerian film actress.

Early life and career
Odunkanwi was born in Iwo, Osun State. In 1973, she started her acting career as a teenager under Eda Onileola Theatre Troupe before she later got popular for her character role in the movie  titled Oko; produced by Oga Bello. In 2015, she was diagnosed of Ischemic stroke which made her take a break from acting.

In 2016, she was honored with the Special Recognition Award at the City People Entertainment Awards for her contribution to the growth of the Yoruba Movie Industry.

Filmography
 Oko
 Ayitale
 Idunnu Okan
 Mayowa
 Okobo Dimeji

Personal life
In 2022, her daughter announced she was dead but later confirmed that she is still alive.

Awards and nominations

References

External links

1960 births
Living people
Yoruba actresses
Nigerian film actresses
Actresses in Yoruba cinema